Dan Leek is an English former professional rugby union player.

Leek was educated at schools in Croydon, first, at the independent Laleham Lea Primary School, followed by The John Fisher School, which was a selective senior Roman Catholic School for boys during his time there, and was fondly known by the nicknames: "Leeky". He played rugby union a number of teams, most notably London Wasps between 2001 and 2003. He became a coach at Beckenham RFC in 2012.

References

Year of birth missing (living people)
Living people
English rugby union players
Rugby union players from Croydon